Aspen/Pitkin County Airport , also known as Sardy Field, is a county-owned public-use airport located three nautical miles (6 km) northwest of the central business district of Aspen, in Pitkin County, Colorado, United States. It has one asphalt paved runway designated 15/33 which measures 8,006 by 100 feet (2,440 x 30 m).

It is included in the Federal Aviation Administration (FAA) National Plan of Integrated Airport Systems for 2019–2023, in which it is categorized as a non-hub primary commercial service facility.

Facilities

For the 12-month period ending January 1, 2017, the airport had 42,405 aircraft operations, an average of 116 per day: 51% general aviation, 26% air taxi, 23% scheduled commercial, and <1% military. In March 2019, there were 95 aircraft based at this airport: 66 single-engine, 10 multi-engine, 13 jet, 5 helicopter, and 1 glider.

Aspen/Pitkin Co. Airport has more regular service from major carriers than any other regional ski town airport in North America. In the winter, its regular, weekly flights number more than 170 (not including extra flights often run during busy holiday seasons). In addition to regular service from Denver, Aspen sees more than 20 flights a week from Chicago and Los Angeles.

Runway
In 2007, the runway was completely rehabilitated with new grooved asphalt. The airport meets modified FAA D-III airport reference code standards.

On April 4, 2011, the airport began a $15.5 million runway extension project which added 1,000 feet of runway length to the existing 8,006 feet long runway.  This project was completed on November 2, 2011.

Per Title X of the Pitkin County Code, the airport has several unique operating limitations.  Due to non-standard runway/taxiway separation, the airport has a  aircraft wingspan limitation. Aircraft weight is restricted to  maximum certificated gross landing weight or less. For rough guidance, these restrictions preclude aircraft like the current 737 series and larger.  The Aspen/Pitkin County Airport also has an airport operating curfew. No aircraft operations are permitted between 23:00 local and 07:00 local. No aircraft departures are permitted after 22:30 local. FAR Part 36 Stage II aircraft operations are not permitted more than 30 minutes after official sunset. For most aircraft operations, especially commercial operations using CRJ-700 planes, aircraft must land to the south but take off to the north. This can lead to occasional delays, cancellations, and weight restrictions depending on wind strength and direction.

Terminal

The Aspen/Pitkin County airport terminal is a  single floor facility, which has undergone several renovations since its original construction in 1976.  The airport terminal hosts six rental car operations, a year-round guest services operation, plus Jeddadiahs  restaurant and gift shops. The terminal has a cellphone parking lot to accommodate motorists waiting to pick up passengers. The 40 spaced parking lot is located in a manner to allow motorists to loop and re-access the terminal without getting back on HWY-82. Parking is not allowed in front of Aspen’s airport terminal.

Airport operations
The Aspen/Pitkin County Airport is certificated as a Class I, ARFF Index B commercial service airport under FAR Part 139.  The airport's operations department is responsible for daily compliance with FAA Part 139, including daily airport safety inspections, rules and regulations enforcement, and aircraft rescue and firefighting (ARFF).  In July 2009, the airport took delivery of a new Oshkosh Striker 1500 Index B ARFF truck.  Mutual aid response to airport incidents is provided by the Aspen Fire Department, Pitkin County Sheriffs Department, Aspen Ambulance, and others.

Airport operations staff operates from the airport's Operations Center, constructed in 2006 on the west side of the airport.  This facility houses airport operations and facilities maintenance staff, as well as the airport's fleet of ARFF, snow removal, and other airport equipment.

General aviation services are provided by Atlantic Aviation, the airport's sole fixed-base operator.

The FAA has installed an FAA Weather Camera in addition to the Automated surface observing system (ASOS) available to help pilots determine the weather conditions at Aspen airport and the surrounding area.

Airlines and destinations

Passenger

Statistics

Accidents and incidents
 On January 14, 1970, an Aspen Airways Convair CV-240-12 (registration N270L) landed on the runway with its landing gear raised. The pilot in command wanted to keep the airspeed above 130 knots in case a go-around was required, and failed to extend the landing gear on short final. The gear warning horn did not sound. There were no injuries.
 On January 5, 1989, a Federal Express Cessna 208B Super Cargomaster (registration N945FE) executed a missed approach but failed to do so in accordance with published missed approach procedures, resulting in a collision with trees. The pilot, the only occupant, was uninjured.
 On February 13, 1991, a Richmor Aviation  Learjet 35A (registration N535PC) stalled and collided with terrain and killed all three people on board. The FAA determined the flight crew's failure to maintain airspeed and control of the aircraft, as well as the execution of an unstabilized approach and the snow-covered mountainous terrain, to be contributing factors.
 On January 6, 1996, a Learjet 60 (registration XA-ICA) touched down in a snow-covered field 1,000 ft from the runway threshold and 25 feet right of the runway centerline. The nose gear collapsed and the aircraft slid through several snow berms before coming to a halt on the runway at the 4,000 ft mark. It was determined by FAA investigators that sun glare, the snow-covered runway, and the airport's failure to properly remove snow from the runway were the causes for the crash.
 On March 29, 2001, a Gulfstream III (registration N303GA), owned by Avjet Corporation, crashed on approach to runway 15 killing all 18 occupants on board. The flight crew's operation of the aircraft below minimum descent altitude without visual reference with the runway was determined to be the main cause, but the FAA also recognized that an unclear NOTAM that was issued for the approach confused the flight crew. Additionally, the FAA's failure to communicate the restrictions to Aspen Tower controllers contributed. The pilot was also under pressure to land from the charter customer.
 On June 7, 2009, a Learjet 60 (registration N500SW) veered off the runway on landing and came to rest on the right side of the runway with a collapsed right main gear, with no injuries to the eight persons on board.
 On January 5, 2014, a Bombardier Challenger 600 (registration N115WF) crashed upon landing and experienced a post-impact fire, killing one occupant and seriously injuring the other two persons on board. A National Transportation Safety Board report in 2017 concluded that the crash was due to pilot inexperience as they attempted to land with 25 knot wind gusts and failed "to conduct a go-around when the approach became unstabilized".

References

External links

 Aspen/Pitkin County Airport, official website
 Aspen/Pitkin County Airport (ASE) at Colorado DOT airport directory
 Aerial image as of October 1999 from USGS The National Map
 
 

Airports in Colorado
Aspen, Colorado
Transportation buildings and structures in Pitkin County, Colorado
County airports in Colorado